Two Degrees was a one-for-one food company that produced vegan snack bars. With one of their main ways to promote their business being to using some of their profit to give food to hungry children. Two Degrees Food has provided meals to children in areas including the United States, Kenya, India, Malawi, Somalia, Colombia, and Myanmar.

Overview 

Will Hauser and Lauren Walters founded Two Degrees Food in 2010 and launched in early 2011. The company's board of directors also included Keith Monda, the former President of Coach Inc.

Hauser and Walters picked the name Two Degrees to emphasize the idea that only two degrees of separation exist between consumers to a hungry child. In 2011, Two Degrees Food was recognized as a runner up in the Katerva Awards for Food Security.

Two Degrees Food's board of advisors included physicians Steve Collins and Judith Palfrey. The company was based in San Francisco, California, and had a staff of about 23 people.

Unfortunately, Two Degrees went out of business in February 2017.

Product and mission 

Two Degrees Food produced a line of supposedly all-natural, gluten-free, vegan and GMO-free nutrition bars in several flavors to appeal to a wider audience, they called them Apple Pecan, Cherry Almond, Chocolate Banana, and Chocolate Peanut. The recipes were developed by Barr Hogen.

The company distributed bars to health food, specialty, grocery, college and food service channels across the United States, including more than 1000 locations including Whole Foods, stores, Barnes & Noble College bookstores, coffee shops, and corporations.

The meals were locally sourced, and the company partnered with global non-profits and NGOs in order to fulfill this mission. Their partners included Feeding America, Partners in Health, World Food Program USA, Akshaya Patra and others.

References

External links 
 

Food and drink companies of the United States
Veganism
Food and drink companies established in 2010
Companies based in San Francisco
2010 establishments in California
Food and drink in the San Francisco Bay Area
Food and drink companies based in California
American companies established in 2010